The 2000 FIA GT Monza 500 km was the third round the 2000 FIA GT Championship season.  It took place at the Autodromo Nazionale Monza, Italy, on April 16, 2000.

Official results
Class winners in bold.  Cars failing to complete 70% of winner's distance marked as Not Classified (NC).

Statistics
 Pole position – #25 Carsport Holland – 1:58.250
 Fastest lap – #14 Lister Storm Racing – 1:46.665
 Average speed – 184.284 km/h

References

 
 
 

M
FIA GT Monza